De Castelnau station is a Montreal Metro station in the Villeray–Saint-Michel–Parc-Extension borough of Montreal, Quebec, Canada. It is operated by the Société de transport de Montréal (STM) and serves the Blue Line. It is located in the Villeray district.

Overview

It is a normal side platform station, built in tunnel with a central volume built in trench. Two entrances, one on each side of boul. Saint-Laurent, give access to a common ticket hall; one is integrated into an apartment building. The station is clad in travertine limestone, a reference to the Italian community in the area, and whimsical bas reliefs by Jean-Charles Charuest depict scenes of the nearby Marché Jean-Talon.

Origin of name
Rue De Castelnau is named for French general Noël Édouard, vicomte de Curières de Castelnau, who successfully defended the French town of Nancy during World War I.

Connecting bus routes

Nearby points of interest
Marché Jean-Talon
Stade IGA (Stade Jarry)
Parc Jarry

References

External links
De Castelnau station on STM website
Montreal by Metro, metrodemontreal.com
2011 STM System Map
Metro Map

Blue Line (Montreal Metro)
Villeray–Saint-Michel–Parc-Extension
Railway stations in Canada opened in 1986